John P. Hansen (born July 9, 1943) was a Michigan politician.

Early life
Hansen was born on July 9, 1943.

Education
Hansen earned a B.A. in science education, an M.A. in guidance and counseling, and a Ph.D. in school law, all from the University of Michigan.

Career
Hansen used to work as a teacher. Hansen served as superintendent of Dexter Community Schools from 1984 to 1998. Hansen worked as a part-time professor at Eastern Michigan University. Hansen served as a member of the Dexter Village Council. On November 3, 1998, Curtis was elected to the Michigan House of Representatives where he represented the 52nd district from January 13, 1999 to December 31, 2002. Starting on January 20, 2012, Hansen served as interim city manager of Ypsilanti, Michigan after the previous city manager, Ed Koryzno, stepped down from the position. In February 2012, Hansen resigned from the position, leaving Ypsilanti city clerk Frances McMullan to serve as acting city manager during the vacancy he left.

Personal life
Hansen married Sandra and had one daughter.

References

Living people
1943 births
University of Michigan alumni
American city managers
Eastern Michigan University faculty
Politicians from Ypsilanti, Michigan
People from Dexter, Michigan
Democratic Party members of the Michigan House of Representatives
20th-century American politicians
21st-century American politicians